is a Japanese wrestler. He competed in the men's Greco-Roman 100 kg at the 1976 Summer Olympics.

References

1948 births
Living people
Japanese male sport wrestlers
Olympic wrestlers of Japan
Wrestlers at the 1976 Summer Olympics
Sportspeople from Hiroshima
20th-century Japanese people